is a Japanese manga series written by Yoshiaki Tabata and illustrated by Yūgo Ōkuma. It is based on Black Jack by Osamu Tezuka and serves as its prequel. It was serialized in Akita Shoten's Young Champion magazine between November 2011 and June 2019. An anime adaptation aired in Japan from October to December 2015. The story follows Black Jack as a medical student in the 1960s.

Plot
In the 1960s, Kuroo Hazama is a gifted young medical student with a dark past who tries to make a name for himself. Despite only being a medical student, he is a brilliant surgeon and attracts attention after he completes seemingly impossible operations and displays greater skills than his formal training would allow. Hazama devotes himself to the world of medicine together with his friends, the intern Maiko Okamoto and the doctor Yabu. Set against the background of student riots, war, and corruption, Hazama finds himself caught up in a series of circumstances which challenge his integrity as a person and his path towards becoming a surgeon. The choices he makes
leads him to become the legend known as Black Jack.

Characters

Portrayed by: Masaki Okada (live-action drama),  (anime)

 (anime)

 (anime)

 (anime)

 (anime)

 (anime)

 (anime)

 (anime)

 (anime)

 (anime)

 (anime)

 (anime)

 (anime)

 (anime)

 (anime)

 (anime)

 (anime)

 (anime)

 (anime)

Media

Manga
The prequel manga based on Osamu Tesuka's Black Jack manga series is written by Yoshiaki Tabata, and illustrated by Yūgo Ōkuma. It began serialization in Akita Shoten's Young Champion issue #23 of 2011, released on November 22, and finished in the issue #13 of 2019, published on June 11. Akita Shoten published the first tankōbon volume of the manga on May 18, 2012, and sixteen volumes have been released as of August 20, 2019. On March 2017, it was announced that the manga gone on hiatus to prepare for the next arc in summer 2017.

Live-action drama
A live-action TV special adaptation aired at April 23, 2011 at Nippon TV. The special starred lead actor Masaki Okada as young Black Jack. Kentaro Otani directed the special.

Anime
A 12-episode anime television series adaptation directed aired from October to December 2015 on TBS, CBC, SUN, and BS-TBS. Produced by Tezuka Productions, it is directed by Mitsuko, with Ryōsuke Takahashi handling series composition and serving as supervisor, Miyuki Katayama and Nana Miura designing the characters and Daisuke Ikeda, Hirohito Furui and Kensuke Akiyama composing the music. The anime has been licensed in North America by Sentai Filmworks and is also streaming on Crunchyroll.

Episode list

References

External links
 Anime official website 
 

2011 manga
Akita Shoten manga
Seinen manga
Sentai Filmworks
Tezuka Productions
Fiction set in the 1960s